Spool is a Canadian record label which was founded 1997 in Peterborough, Ontario, Canada. Their first releases were in 1998. They relocated to Uxbridge, Ontario in 1999. The name comes from the play by Samuel Beckett: Krapp's Last Tape. In the play, Krapp becomes fascinated by the word "spool" and repeats it several times. On December 27, 2001, Spool was given national notice in an article in The Globe and Mail by Canadian jazz critic Mark Miller, who said "It's work supported not by the majors, but by smaller companies – as small as Uxbridge, Ont., label Spool which released two of the most interesting Canadian CDs of 2001, West Coast guitarist Tony Wilson's melancholic Lowest Note and a boisterous collaboration between George Lewis and Vancouver's NOW Orchestra, The Shadowgraph Series." Spool releases also received reviews in the Toronto Star by Geoff Champman, as well as Coda (magazine), DownBeat, Vancouver Province, La Scena musicale, The Wire (magazine), Exclaim magazine, The Georgia Straight. In 2004, Spool received nominations for "producer of the year" and "label of the year" by the National Jazz Awards of Canada. Mark Miller, in Jazz Education Journal wrote: "And consider Canada's most active independent record labels, Ambiances Magnetiques and Effendi in Montreal, Cornerstone in Toronto, Maximum Jazz and Songlines in Vancouver, Spool in Uxbridge, Ontario and Victo in Victoriaville, Quebec. By and large, their rosters are made up of artists who seem intent on creating vital, interesting and, above all, personal music that draws not on any one tradition, but on many..."

Discography

Line
Line: noun: a spatial location defined by a real or imaginary unidimensional extent
 SPL130 Anthony Braxton & the AIMToronto Orchestra Creative Orchestra (Guelph) 2007
 SPL129 Box-Cutter New Rules for Noise (w/ Francois Houle & Gordon Grdina)
 SPL128 Box-Cutter Unlearn (w/ Francois Houle & Gordon Grdina)
 SPL127 Dewey Redman & Francois Carrier Open Spaces
 SPL126 Paul Rutherford/Ken Vandermark/Torsten Muller/Dylan van der Schyff Hoxha
 SPL125 Taking Pictures with Wayne Horvitz Intersection Poems
 SPL124 Peggy Lee Band Worlds Apart
 SPL123 Rake-Star Some RA
 SPL122 Jonathan Segel & Shoko Hikage GEN
 SPL121 Brett Larner, Joelle Leandre & Kazuhisa Uchihashi No Day Rising
 SPL120 Fred Frith, Joelle Leandre & Jonathan Segel Tempted To Smile
 SPL119 Tobias Delius, Wilbert de Joode & Dylan van der Schyff The Flying Deer - 2006.
 SPL118 Michael Moore/ Peggy Lee/ Dylan van der Schyff Floating 1..2..3
 SPL117 Peggy Lee Band Sounds from the Big House
 SPL116 Fred Frith, John Oswald, Anne Bourne dearness
 SPL115 Travis Baker, Sara Shoenbeck Yesca One
 SPL114 Brett Larner Itadakimasu. Duos: Anthony Braxton, Jim O’Rourke, Gianni Gebbia, Taku Sugimoto,+
 SPL113 George Lewis & the NOW Orchestra The Shadowgraph Series - 2001.
 SPL112 Tony Wilson Sextet The Lowest Note - 2000.
 SPL111 Queen Mab (Jack Vorvis, Fides Krucker,Tina Kiik, Lee Pui Ming, Fides Krucker, Victor Bateman) close - 2000.
 SPL110 Mats Gustafsson, Kurt Newman, Mike Genarro Port Huron Picnic - 2000.
 SPL109 John Butcher, Gino Robair, Matthew Sperry 12 Milagritos - 2000.
 SPL108 Rake: David Broscoe, Jamie Gullikson, Rory Magill, Rake - 2000.
 SPL107 The NOW Orchestra with guests George Lewis, Vinny Golia & Paul Cram Wowow - 1999.
 SPL106 Jacques Israelievitch, Reinhard Reitzenstein, Jesse Stewart, Gayle Young The Test Tubes- 1999.
 SPL105 The Peggy Lee Band - 1999.
 SPL104 Eyvind Kang, Francois Houle, Dylan van der Schyff Pieces of Time - 1999.
 SPL103 Henry Kaiser, Paul Plimley (with Danielle DeGruttola) Passwords - 1998.
 SPL102 Peggy Lee, Dylan van der Schyff These Are Our Shoes - 1998.
 SPL101 Chris Tarry, Dylan van der Schyff Sponge - 1998.

Field
Field: noun: a set of elements such that addition and multiplication are commutative and associative and multiplication is distributive over addition and there are two elements 0 and 1
 SPF301 Broken Record Chamber, Free Improv For Robots- 1998.
 SPF302 Francois Houle, Au Coeur du Litige - 2000.
 SPF303 John Butcher, Mike Hansen & Tomasz Krakowiak, Equation - 2006.
 SPF304 Mike Hansen & Tomasz Krakowiak, Relay - 2005.
 SPF305 Smash & Teeny with John Butcher, Gathering - 2005.

Arc
Arc: noun: the apparent path described above and below the horizon by a celestial body
 SPA401 The Skronktet West EL- 2006.
 SPA402 John Shiurba Triplicate - 2006.
 SPA403 Matthias von Imhof Mental Scars - 2006.

Point
Point: noun: a geometric element that has position but no extension
 SPP201 Bradshaw Pack Alogos (with Talking Pictures, Pacific Baroque Orchestra, Standing Wave & David Maggs) - 2006.
 SPP202 Allison Cameron Ornaments - 2001.
 SPP203 John Korsrud Odd Jobs, Assorted Climaxes (with Hard Rubber Orchestra, Combustion Chamber, Ron Samworth and Joe Keithley) - 2005.

Spurn
Spurn: verb: reject with disdain or contempt.
 Spurn1 dk & the perfectly ordinary CAR DEW TREAT US (Allison Cameron, Rod Dubé, & Lawrence Joseph) with Guest Artists: Philippe Battikha (Ratchet Orchestra), Sean Caighean, Paul Dutton, Caroline Kunzle, Brett Larner, Al Margolis If, Bwana, Gino Robair, Paul Serralheiro, Vergil Sharkya, Ben Wilson - 2017.
 Spurn2 Equivalent Insecurity Shed Metal (dk & Dan Lander) - 2017.
 Spurn3 The Machine is Broken, Terry Rusling - 2019.

References

Further reading
 Tiina Kiik, "Spool Spurn series: The Machine is Broken / Shed Metal / Car Dew Treat Us (pages from Cornelius Cardew’s Treatise randomly selected)" Whole Note Magazine, Vol. 25, No. 2 (October 2019) pp. 71–72.
 Nick Storring, "Spool: Music in the Margins" Musicworks Issue 129, Winter 2017.
 
 David Dacks, "Label Life; Spool," Exclaim Magazine, 
 Alexander Varty, "Preaching Improv's Gospel: The minds behind the Spool record label have a missionary zeal," The Georgia Straight, February 3–10, 2000.
 Miller, Mark. Jazz Education Journal; Manhattan, Kan. Vol. 35, Iss. 4,  (Jan 2003): C10-C12, C14.
 Passionate Pairing, Vancouver's NOW Orchestra artfully blends New Music and the Blues, The Globe and Mail, September 7, 2000, p. R4 by Mark Miller.
 The Toronto Star, August 22, 1998, Vancouver duo puts best footwear forward by Geoff Chapman.
 The Toronto Star, October 16, 1999, The Peggy Lee Band reviewed by Geoff Chapman.
 The Globe and Mail, December 27, 2000, p. R5, Year overview by Mark Miller cites Spool recording Francois Houle's Au Couer du Litige.
 The Globe and Mail, February 8, 2001, p. R5, Review of Tony Wilson Sextet's The Lowest Note by Mark Miller.
 The Toronto Star, April 28, 2001, Tony Wilson Sextet The Lowest Note reviewed by Geoff Chapman.
 The Toronto Star, August 4, 2001, George Lewis and the NOW Orchestra The Shadowgraph Series reviewed by Geoff Chapman.
 The Globe and Mail, August 17, 2001, p. R6, Review of Francois Houle's Au Couer du Lier du Litage by Mark Miller.
 The Toronto Star, 07 Nov 2002, page J8, George Lewis and NOW Orchestra Floating 1...2...3 reviewed by Geoff Chapman.
 The Globe and Mail, June 7, 2001, p. R7, Review of The Shadowgraph Series by Mark Miller.
 The Globe and Mail, December 27, 2001, p. R6, Review of Au Couer du Litage by Mark Miller.
 The Globe and Mail, December 27, 2001, p. R3, Burns, Krall and all that hype by Mark Miller: "It’s work supported not by the majors, but by smaller companies — as small as Uxbridge, Ont., label Spool which released two of the most interesting Canadian CDs of 2001, West coast guitarist Tony Wilson’s melancholic Lowest Note and a boisterous collaboration between trombonist/composer George Lewis and Vancouver’s NOW Orchestra, The Shadowgraph Series."
 The Globe and Mail, June 13, 2002, p. R4, Review of Sounds from the Big House by Mark Miller.
 The Globe and Mail, February 26, 2004, p. R3, Review of Some Ra by Mark Miller.
 The Globe and Mail, July 15, 2004, p. R4, Review of Worlds Apart by Mark Miller.
 The Globe and Mail, August 19, 2005, p. R5, Review of The Flying Deer by Mark Miller.
 The Globe and Mail, December 18, 2003, p. R5, Review of Odd Jobs, Assorted Climaxes by Mark Miller.
 The Globe and Mail, November 12, 2005, p. R8, Feature article on Tony Wilson And now fresh from Hornby Island by Mark Miller.
 The Globe and Mail, December 18, 2003, p. R5, Review of Odd Jobs, Assorted Climaxes by Mark Miller.

External links
 Spool site

Jazz record labels
Companies based in Ontario
Record labels established in 1998